The European Film Award for Best Cinematographer, also known as Carlo Di Palma European Cinematographer Award, is an award given to cinematographers working in the motion picture industry by the European Film Academy.

Winners and nominees

1980s

1990s

2000s

2010s

2020s

See also
 César Award for Best Cinematography, Lumières Award for Best Cinematography
 BAFTA Award for Best Cinematography
 Lola Awards for Best Cinematography
 David di Donatello for Best Cinematography
 Goya Award for Best Cinematography
 Polish Academy Award for Best Cinematography, Camerimage
 Golden Calf for Best Camera
 Czech Lion Award for Best Cinematography
 Magritte Award for Best Cinematography
 Hellenic Film Academy Awards for Best Cinematography
 Guldbagge Award for Best Cinematography
 Robert Award for Best Cinematography, Bodil Award for Best Cinematographer
 Golden Arena for Best Cinematography
 Manaki Brothers Film Festival

References

External links
European Film Academy archive

Cinematographer
 
Awards for best cinematography
Awards established in 1989
1989 establishments in Europe